Market Street Bridge may refer to:
 Market Street Bridge (Chattanooga), officially the Chief John Ross Bridge, in Chattanooga, Tennessee, United States
 Market Street Bridge (Passaic River) in New Jersey, United States
 Market Street Bridge (Philadelphia) in Philadelphia, Pennsylvania, United States
 Market Street Bridge (Ohio River) in Ohio and West Virginia, United States
 Market Street Bridge (Susquehanna River), across the Susquehanna River in Harrisburg, Pennsylvania, United States
 Market Street Bridge (Wilkes-Barre, Pennsylvania), across the Susquehanna River in Wilkes-Barre, Pennsylvania, United States
 Carl E. Stotz Memorial Little League Bridge, formerly Market Street Bridge, in Williamsport, Pennsylvania, United States
 South Market Street Bridge, Wilmington, Delaware, United States
 Market Street Bridge (Clearfield, Pennsylvania)